Thomas Birch (1705–1766) was an English historian.

Thomas Birch may also refer to:

 Thomas Birch (artist) (1779–1851), American portrait and marine painter
 Thomas Birch (New Zealand politician) (1825–1880), New Zealand politician who represented Dunedin
 Sir Thomas Birch, 2nd Baronet (1791–1880), British MP for Liverpool
 Thomas Birch (priest) (1767–1840), Archdeacon of Lewes, 1823–1840
 Thomas Birch (English Parliamentarian) (1608–1678), English politician
 Thomas Ledlie Birch (1754–1828), Presbyterian minister and radical democrat

See also
 Thomas Burch (disambiguation)